Nanu Oya is a village in Sri Lanka, named after the Nanu Oya river.

See also 
 Nanu Oya railway station
 List of towns in Central Province, Sri Lanka

External links 

Populated places in Nuwara Eliya District